Kharinskaya is a rural locality (a village) in Abakanovskoye Rural Settlement, Cherepovetsky District, Vologda Oblast, Russia. The population was 8 as of 2002. There are 6 streets.

Geography 
Yeremeyevo is the nearest rural locality.

References 

Rural localities in Cherepovetsky District